Yayuk Basuki and Caroline Vis won in the final 6–0, 4–6, 6–2 against Åsa Carlsson and Karina Habšudová.

Seeds
Champion seeds are indicated in bold text while text in italics indicates the round in which those seeds were eliminated.

 Arantxa Sánchez-Vicario /  Nathalie Tauziat (semifinals)
 Mary Pierce /  Barbara Schett (quarterfinals)
 Alexandra Fusai /  Rita Grande (semifinals)
 Åsa Carlsson /  Karina Habšudová (final)

Draw

References
 2001 Dubai Duty Free Women's Open Doubles Draw

2001 Dubai Tennis Championships and Duty Free Women's Open
Doubles